The Higher Institute of Music in Damascus (HIM) is the national music academy in Syria.

History
The HIM was founded in 1962 by music educator and conductor Solhi al-Wadi as the Arab Institute of Music and was established in its current form as a conservatory in 1990 by presidential decree. The aim of the institute is to prepare upcoming generations of musicians to perform both Arabic and international music.

The institute trains students in various Arabic and western musical instruments. It also teaches the principles of individual, collective, Arabic and international vocal music performance. Further, it offers courses for future composers and band leaders and prepares researchers in musicology, especially to study Arabic music. The institute has trained students for musical ensembles with string, wind and percussion instruments, for the Syrian National Symphony Orchestra, Arabic music choirs and orchestra, as well as for opera singing. In 2004, musicians Kinan Azmeh, Dima Orsho, Issam Rafea and other former graduates of the HIM formed the jazz fusion band Hewar.

Further, the HIM regularly participates in musical activities both in Damascus and in other cities in Syria. The HIM is housed in the same building complex as the Higher Institute of Dramatic Arts and located next to the Damascus Opera House on Umayyad Square.

Several of the institute's graduates have moved abroad, often for further training or engagements at music venues, but also fleeing the Civil War in Syria since 2011. Before this and since its beginnings, the institute had employed several Russian teachers seconded by the Soviet Union. Among them was Victor Babenko, choir conductor and the leading author of a musical dictionary and harmony textbook for Syrian music.

Professional musicians from Syria have performed at concerts in the Middle East, the U.S. and notably in Europe, such as the Morgenland Festival Osnabrück in Germany.

Notable staff and graduates 

Faculty
 Solhi al-Wadi, founder and first director
 Cynthia al-Wadi, (piano)
 Athil Hamdan, chellist and second director after al-Wadi
 Lubana al Quntar, soprano singer, former Head of the Opera Department at the High Institute of Music in Damascus (2003–11)
 Issam Rafea, former Head of the Arabic Music Department, oud player and composer, based in the U.S.
 Gaswan Zerikly, (piano)
 Raad Khalaf, (violin and ear training)
 Victor Babenko, and other teachers from Russia (harmony, music theory and choir conductor)
 Anatoly Muratov (clarinet)
 Vladymir Zaretsky (piano)
 Victor Bunin (piano)

Graduates
 Dima Orsho, soprano singer and composer, based in the U.S.
 Kinan Azmeh, clarinetist and composer, based in the U.S.
 Lena Chamamyan, soprano singer and songwriter, based in Paris
 Mireille Bittar, soprano singer, based in Amsterdam
 Maias Alyamani, violinist and composer
 Hassan Taha, oud and horn player, based in Switzerland
 Basel Rajoub, saxophone player, based in Switzerland
 Rasha Rizk, singer
 Kinan Abou-Afach, cellist, based in the U.S.
 Shafi Badreddine, oud player and composer
 Mohannad Nasser, oud player and composer
 Dania Tabbaa, pianist

See also 

 Music of Syria
 Hewar
 Morgenland Festival Osnabrück

References

Further reading

External links
 Oficial page

Education in Syria
Educational institutions established in 1990
1990 establishments in Syria
Buildings and structures in Damascus
Art schools in Syria